Republic Day or the Day of the Republic or Ilinden (Macedonian: Ден на Републиката, Den na Republikata, Илинден) is a major national holiday of North Macedonia. It is celebrated on 2 August, which is also a major religious holiday – Ilinden (Macedonian: Илинден; St. Elijah day; the day is reckoned as 20 July according to the Julian Calendar). It commemorates two major events in the establishment of the statehood of the country which took place on this date: 
 The Ilinden Uprising of 1903 which was organized by the Internal Macedonian Revolutionary Organization against the Ottoman Empire, and during which a short-lived Kruševo Republic was proclaimed, and
 The First Assembly of ASNOM of 1944, during World War II in Yugoslav Macedonia, which laid the foundation of the SR Macedonia.

Macedonians have traditionally celebrated this day, also called Ilinden, because of its religious significance which has its roots in the Christian St. Elijah (Macedonian: Св. Илија, Sv. Ilija). It has been proclaimed a national holiday since 1944. Major gatherings are held in the monasteries, and there is a march of horsemen from Skopje, the capital, to Kruševo, where during the Ilinden Uprising the Kruševo Republic was established. The main celebration takes place in Kruševo, in the area called Mechkin Kamen (Bear's Rock), where a major battle with the Ottoman army took place in August 1903.

See also
 Public holidays in North Macedonia

References

August observances
Public holidays in North Macedonia
North Macedonia